Kathi Vidal is an American intellectual property lawyer and former engineer who serves as Under Secretary of Commerce for Intellectual Property and Director of the United States Patent and Trademark Office (USPTO).

Education 
Vidal earned a Bachelor of Science in electrical engineering from Binghamton University, a Master of Science in electrical engineering from Syracuse University, and a Juris Doctor from the University of Pennsylvania Law School.

Career 
Vidal began her career as an engineer for General Electric and Lockheed Martin, working in the areas of artificial intelligence, software engineering, and circuitry. In 1996 and 1997, she served as a law clerk for Judge Alvin Anthony Schall. From 1997 to 2017, she was a litigator at Fish & Richardson. Since April 2017, she has been the Silicon Valley managing partner and patent litigator at Winston & Strawn.

USPTO Nomination
On October 26, 2021, President Joe Biden nominated Vidal to be the next Under Secretary of Commerce for Intellectual Property and Director of the United States Patent and Trademark Office (USPTO). Hearings were held before the Senate Judiciary Committee on her nomination on December 1, 2021. The committee favorably reported her nomination on January 13, 2022 by a 17–5 vote. On April 5, 2022, the United States Senate confirmed Vidal by voice vote. She began work at USPTO on April 13, 2022, and was sworn in as under secretary on April 19.

References 

Living people
Binghamton University alumni
Syracuse University alumni
University of Pennsylvania Law School alumni
California lawyers
Intellectual property lawyers
Year of birth missing (living people)
Biden administration personnel